Barclay Township may refer to the following townships in the United States:

 Barclay Township, Black Hawk County, Iowa
 Barclay Township, Cass County, Minnesota